Dean Memorial Airport is a public use airport in Grafton County, New Hampshire, United States. It is owned by the town of Haverhill and is located three nautical miles (5.56 km) northeast of the central business district. It is included in the Federal Aviation Administration (FAA) National Plan of Integrated Airport Systems for 2017–2021, in which it is categorized as a basic general aviation facility.

Although most U.S. airports use the same three-letter location identifier for the FAA and IATA, this airport is assigned 5B9 by the FAA but has no designation from the IATA.

Facilities and aircraft 
It has one runway designated 01/19 with an asphalt surface measuring 2,511 by 58 feet (765 x 18 m).

For the 12-month period ending July 31, 2008, the airport had 4,750 aircraft operations, an average of 13 per day: 100% general aviation. At that time there were 19 aircraft based at this airport: 95% single-engine, and 5% helicopter.

References

External links 
 Aerial photo as of 13 April 1998 from USGS The National Map
 
 

Airports in New Hampshire
Transportation buildings and structures in Grafton County, New Hampshire
Haverhill, New Hampshire